Angela Bailey (28 February 1962 – 31 July 2021) was a Canadian track and field athlete. She is the Canadian record holder in the 100 metres with her personal best of 10.98 seconds in 1987. She also holds the 200 metres indoor national record with 23.32 seconds in 1984. She won an Olympic silver medal in the 4×100 metres relay in 1984, three relay silver medals at the Commonwealth Games, and a bronze medal in the 60 metres at the 1987 World Indoor Championships.

Career
Bailey was born in Coventry, Warwickshire, England. She first came to international attention at the Commonwealth Games in Edmonton in 1978. In 1980, she won gold in both 100 metres and 200 metres at the first Pan American Junior Track and Field Championships in Sudbury, defeating the favoured American sprinter Michele Glover decisively in both distances. She was selected for the 1980 Olympic team but Canada boycotted the Moscow event.

Bailey won all her races on a tour of New Zealand in late 1981, which included three gold medals at the Pacific Conference Games in the 100m, 200m and 4 x 100m relay. She placed fourth in the 100 meters and seventh in the 200 metres at the 1982 Commonwealth Games, and was again fourth in the 100 metres in 1986. She won a silver medal for the 4×100 m relay at the 1978 Commonwealth Games, and did so again in both the 1982 and 1986 games.

At the 1983 World Championships, Bailey placed fifth in the 100 metres, seventh in the 200 metres and fifth in the 4×100 m relay. At the 1984 Los Angeles Olympics, she came in sixth in the 100 metres and won a silver medal in the 4×100 metres relay with Marita Payne, Angella Taylor and France Gareau.

Originally fourth in the 60 metres final at the 1987 World Indoor Championships, Bailey was promoted to the bronze medal in 1989, due to the disqualification of Canadian team-mate Angella Issajenko after the Dubin Inquiry. She set the Canadian 100 metres record with 10.98 secs on 6 July 1987 in Budapest, and went on to finish seventh in the 100 metres final at the 1987 World Championships in Rome. She was a quarter-finalist in the 100 metres at the 1988 Seoul Olympics.

Death
Diagnosed with Stage IV lung cancer in the fall of 2020, Bailey died of cancer in Toronto on 31 July 2021, aged 59. A statement from the family read, in part, that Bailey "persevered with amazing strength and resilience as she battled cancer alongside her five year struggle with mental illness."

National titles
Canadian Track and Field Championships
100 metres: 1985, 1990
200 metres: 1985

International competitions

Note: At the 1987 World Indoor Championships, Bailey originally finished fourth. She was promoted to the bronze medal position in 1989 after her Canadian teammate Angella Issajenko, who had won the silver medal, was disqualified after admitting long term drug use at the Dubin Inquiry.Note: At the 1981 World Cup, Bailey was representing the Americas continent.

See also
 Canadian records in track and field

References

External links
 
 
 
 
 
 
 Art by Angela Bailey

1962 births
2021 deaths
Athletes from Toronto
Women in sports
Canadian female sprinters
Olympic track and field athletes of Canada
Athletes (track and field) at the 1984 Summer Olympics
Athletes (track and field) at the 1988 Summer Olympics
Commonwealth Games silver medallists for Canada
Commonwealth Games medallists in athletics
Athletes (track and field) at the 1978 Commonwealth Games
Athletes (track and field) at the 1982 Commonwealth Games
Athletes (track and field) at the 1986 Commonwealth Games
Pan American Games track and field athletes for Canada
Athletes (track and field) at the 1999 Pan American Games
World Athletics Championships athletes for Canada
World Athletics Indoor Championships medalists
Black Canadian female track and field athletes
English emigrants to Canada
Naturalized citizens of Canada
Sportspeople from Coventry
UCLA Bruins women's track and field athletes
Medalists at the 1984 Summer Olympics
Olympic silver medalists for Canada
Olympic silver medalists in athletics (track and field)
Deaths from cancer in Ontario
Olympic female sprinters
Medallists at the 1978 Commonwealth Games
Medallists at the 1982 Commonwealth Games
Medallists at the 1986 Commonwealth Games